Walking Cinema: Murder on Beacon Hill is an iPhone application designed by Untravel Media, based on the Parkman–Webster murder case, where John White Webster was accused of the murder of George Parkman.  The case was the first one to use the budding science of forensics. The iPhone application was recognized to be the first iPhone application to be accepted to a major film festival, based on the PBS documentary, Murder at Harvard.  The application is a mixed-reality storytelling experience, combining a roughly one-mile walk with audio, video, a live map and location-based adventures  to guide participants through the story.

Cast and crew

Stops on the tour

The Etherdome at Massachusetts General Hospital
The Liberty Hotel
Black Ink
Blackstone's
Harvard Musical Association
Acorn Street
Parkman's House, 8 Walnut St.
Appalachian Mountain Club, 5 Joy St.

Awards

"Indie Spec New Media", 2010 Boston International Film Festival

References

External links
Official Website

IOS software